List of cultural heritage landmarks of national significance in Zaporizhzhia Oblast.

Listings

List of historic and cultural reserves

 National Reserve "Khortytsia"
 State Historic and Archaeological Reserve "Kamiana Mohyla (Stone Grave)"
 Historic and Architectural Reserve "Popov's Manor house"

References
 Rada.gov.ua: Objects of cultural heritage of national significance in the State Registry of Immobile Landmarks of Ukraine — 2009 Resolution of Cabinet of Ministers of Ukraine.

 01
.
.
.cultural heritage landmarks
History of Zaporizhzhia Oblast
Tourism in Zaporizhzhia Oblast
Zaporizhzhia Oblast